Spirotetramat (ISO Name) is a keto-enol insecticide developed by Bayer CropScience under the brand names Movento and Ultor.

Mechanism
Spirotetramat is active against piercing-sucking insects, such as aphids, mites, and white flies, by acting as an ACC inhibitor, interrupting lipid biosynthesis in the insects. It is a systemic insecticide that penetrates plant leaves when sprayed on. It is ambimobile, being transported both upwards and downwards through vascular bundles. In plants, it is hydrolyzed to the enol form by cleavage of the central ethoxycarbonyl group. This enol is more stable due to double bond being in a ring and the conjugation with the amide group and the benzene ring.

Regulation
Bayer obtained spirotetramat's first regulatory approval in Tunisia in 2007. It was recognized by the European Union May 1, 2014.

Toxicology and safety
Spirotetramat has moderate to low acute toxicity, is irritating to eyes and potentially sensitizing to skin. When tested on rats, it was not shown to be carcinogenic. In Denmark, it is listed as harmful to aquatic invertebrates, but not dangerous to bees.

References

Pyrrolines
Gamma-lactams
Carbonate esters
Ethers
Insecticides
Spiro compounds